The Dumfries Challenger Series is an annual bonspiel (curling tournament) on the men's World Curling Tour (WCT), held at the Dumfries Ice Bowl in Dumfries, Scotland. It has been part of the WCT since 2014. The event was known as the Dumfries Curling Challenge in 2014 and the LELY Dumfries Challenger Series in 2015.

Past champions

References

World Curling Tour events
Curling competitions in Scotland
Sport in Dumfries